= Latanes, Virginia =

Unincorporated community in Virginia, US

Coordinates: 38°10′36″N 76°57′47″W

Latanes is an unincorporated community in Westmoreland County, in the U. S. state of Virginia.
